The Journal of International Security Affairs is an American electronic journal on international relations and U.S. foreign and defense policy published twice annually by the Jewish Institute for National Security Affairs. It was established in 2001 and its editor-in-chief is Ilan Berman (American Foreign Policy Council).

The headquarters of the Journal of International Security Affairs is in Washington, D.C. From 2016 the magazine became a free publication.

References

External links
 

Biannual magazines published in the United States
English-language magazines
Free magazines
Jewish magazines published in the United States
Magazines established in 2001
Magazines published in Washington, D.C.
Political magazines published in the United States